This is a list of Brazilian writers, those born in Brazil or who have established citizenship or residency.

Writers for children

 Ana Maria Machado (born 1941)
 Francisco Marins (1922-2016)
 Lúcia Machado de Almeida (1910–2005)
 Júlio César de Mello e Souza (1895–1974), best known as Malba Tahan
 Maria Clara Machado (1921–2001)
 José Bento Monteiro Lobato (1882–1948)
 Socorro Acioli (born 1975)
 Daniel Munduruku (born 1964)

Chroniclers

 Carlos Drummond de Andrade (1902–1987)
 Fernando Sabino (1923–2004)
 João do Rio (1881–1921)
 João Ubaldo Ribeiro (1941-2014)
 José de Côrtes Duarte (1895–1982)
 Luis Fernando Verissimo (born 1936)
 Paulo Mendes Campos (1922–1991)
 Pedro Bloch (1914–2004)
 Rubem Braga (1913–1990)
 Tati Bernardi (born 1979)

Short story writers

 Adrino Aragão (born 1936)
 Aníbal Machado (1894-1964)
 Alcântara Machado (1901–1935)
 Dalton Trevisan (born 1925)
 João Simões Lopes Neto (1865–1916)
 Márcia Denser (born 1949)
 Murilo Rubião (1916–1991)
 Osman Lins (1924–1978)
 Regina Rheda (born 1957)
 Sonia Coutinho (1939–2013)

Nonfiction writers

 Luiz Castanho de Almeida (1904-1981) priest, historian, writer
 Flavio Alves (born 1969) memoirist
 Rubem Alves (1933-2014) theologian
 Mário de Andrade (1893–1945) poet, musicologist
 Oswald de Andrade (1890–1954) poet, essayist
 Nelson de Araújo (1926–1993) historian, folklorist
 Gustavo Barroso (1888–1959) politician
 Roger Bastide (1898–1974) sociologist
 Leonardo Boff (born 1938) theologian
 Josué de Castro (1908–1973) sociologist
 Gauss Moutinho Cordeiro (born 1952) mathematician
 Oswaldo Cruz (1872–1917) physician, epidemiologist
 Euclides da Cunha (1866–1909) sociologist
 Luís da Câmara Cascudo (Câmara Cascudo) (1898–1986) folklorist

 Alessandra Silvestri-Levy (born 1972)
 Antônio Houaiss (1915–1999) dicionarist
 Aurélio Buarque de Holanda Ferreira (1910–1989)
 José Maria da Silva Paranhos, Baron of Rio Branco (1819–1880) historian
 Caio Prado Júnior (1907–1990) historian
 Celso Furtado (1920–2004) economist
 Darcy Ribeiro (1922–1997) anthropologist
 Florestan Fernandes (1920–1995) historian, sociologist
 Gilberto Freyre (1900–1987) sociologist
 Joaquim Nabuco (1849–1910) memoirist, diplomat
 José Guilherme Merquior (1941–1991) philosopher, sociologist
 José Lino Grünewald (1931–2000) poet, translator
 José Mariano da Conceição Veloso (1742–1811) botanist
 Julio Ximenes Senior (1901–1975) physician
 Miguel Reale (1910–2006) law theorist
 Paulo Alfeu Junqueira Duarte (1899–1984) archaeologist
 Paulo Freire (1921–1997) educator, political theorist
 Plínio Salgado (1901–1975) politician
 Raymundo Faoro (1925–2003) sociologist
 Rinaldo de Lamare (1910–2002) physician
 Roberto da Matta (born 1936) anthropologist
 Ruy Barbosa (1849–1923) political theorist
 Sérgio Buarque de Holanda (1902–1982) historian
 Tristão de Athayde (Alceu Amoroso Lima) (1893–1983) journalist
 Viscount of Taunay (1843–1899) historian
 Olavo de Carvalho (1947–2022) philosopher, journalist
 Vicente Ferreira da Silva (1918–1963) logician

Playwrights

 Ariano Suassuna (1927-2014)
 Artur Azevedo (1855–1908)
 Augusto Boal (1931–2009)
 Dias Gomes (1923–1999)
 Edla Van Steen (1936–2018)
 Gianfrancesco Guarnieri (1934–2006)
 José Paulo Lanyi (born 1970)
 Leilah Assumpção (born 1943)
 Luís Caetano Pereira Guimarães Júnior (1845–1898)
 Luiz Duarte (born 1956)
 Manuel de Araújo Porto-Alegre (1806–1879)
 Maria Clara Machado (1921–2001)
 Luís Carlos Martins Pena (1815–1848)
 Nelson Rodrigues (1912–1980)
 Oswald de Andrade (1890–1954)
 Pedro Bloch (1914–2004)
 Qorpo Santo (Joaquim de Campos Leão) (1829–1883)
 Vianinha (1936–1974)

Journalists

 Alberto Dines (1932-2018)
 Tristão de Athayde (1893–1983)
 Carlos Heitor Cony (1926-2018)
 Carlos Lacerda (1914–1977) journalist
 Elio Gaspari (born 1944)
 Elsie Lessa (1912–2000)
 Gilberto Dimenstein (1956-2020)
 Ivan Lessa (1935-2012)
 José do Patrocínio (1853-1905)
 José Paulo Lanyi (born 1970)
 Mino Carta (1933–1934)
 Paulo Francis (1930–1967)
 Quintino Bocaiúva (1836-1912)
 Samuel Wainer (1912–1980)
 Sergio Buarque de Hollanda (1902–1982)
 Sebastião Nery (born 1932)
 Zuenir Ventura (born 1931)
 Olavo de Carvalho (1947–2022)

Poets

 Adalgisa Nery (1905–1980)
 Adélia Prado (born 1935) poet, chronicler
 Affonso Romano de Sant'Anna (born 1937)
 Alberto de Oliveira (1859–1937)
 Alphonsus de Guimaraens (1870–1921)
 Alvarenga Peixoto (1744–1792)
 Álvares de Azevedo (1831–1852)
 Amália dos Passos Figueiroa (1845–1878)
 Américo Elísio (José Bonifácio de Andrada e Silva) (1763–1838)
 Ana Cristina César (1952–1983)
 António Pereira de Sousa Caldas (1762–1814)
 Adalcinda Camarão (1914–2005)
 Arnaldo Antunes (born 1960)
 Augusto de Campos (born 1931)
 Augusto de Lima (1859–1934)
 Augusto dos Anjos (1884–1914)
 Bruno Tolentino (1940–2007)
 Basílio da Gama (1741–1795)
 Domingos Caldas Barbosa (1740–1800)
 Beatriz Francisca de Assis Brandão (1779–1868)
 Carlos Drummond de Andrade (1902–1987)
 Carpinejar (born 1972)
 Casimiro de Abreu (1839–1860)
 Cassiano Ricardo (1895–1974)
 Castro Alves (1847–1862)
 Cecília Meireles (1901–1964)
 Cláudio Manuel da Costa (1729–1789)
 Colombina (1882–1963)
 Cora Coralina (1889–1985)
 Cruz e Souza (1861–1898)
 Dante Milano (1899–1991)
 Décio Pignatari (1927-2012)
 Esmeralda Ribeiro (born 1959)
 Ferreira Gullar (1930-2016)
 Frank Jorge (born 1966)
 Frederico Barbosa (born 1961)
 Gilberto Mendonça Teles (born 1931)
 Gonçalves Crespo (1846–1883)
 Domingos José Gonçalves de Magalhães (1811–1822)
 Gonçalves Dias (1823–1864)
 Gregório de Matos Guerra (1636–1695)
 Gustavo Dourado (born 1960)
 Haroldo de Campos (1929–2003)
 Helena Parente Cunha (born 1929)
 Henriqueta Lisboa (1901–1985)
 Hilda Hilst (1930–2004)
 João Cabral de Melo Neto (1920–1999)
 Jorge de Lima (1895–1953)
 Katya Chamma (born 1961)
 Manoel de Barros (1916-2014)
 Manuel Bandeira (1886–1968)
 Manuel de Araújo Porto-Alegre (1806–1879)
 Marcia Theophilo (born 1941)
 Mário de Andrade (1893–1945)
 Mário Quintana (1906–1994)
 Menotti Del Picchia (1892–1988)
 Miriam Alves (born 1952)
 Murilo Mendes (1901–1975)
 Olavo Bilac (1865–1918)
 Osório Duque-Estrada (1870–1927)
 Oswald de Andrade (1890–1954)
 Paulo Leminski (1944–1989)
 Raul Bopp (1898–1984)
 Rogério Skylab (born 1958)
 Ronald de Carvalho (1893–1935)
 Santa Rita Durão (1722–1784)
 Silva Alvarenga (1749–1814)
 Tânia Martins (born 1957)
 Tomás Antônio Gonzaga (1744–1819)
 Torquato Neto (1944–1972)
 Vinícius de Moraes (1913–1980)
 Waly Salomão (1943–2003)

Novelists

 A. C. Frieden (born 1966)
 Adolfo Caminha (1867–1897)
 Adonias Filho (1915–1990)
 Aluísio de Azevedo (1857–1913)
 Ana Miranda (born 1951)
 André de Leones (born 1980)
 André Vianco (born 1976)
 Antônio Callado (1917–1997)
 Ariano Suassuna (1927-2014)
 Autran Dourado (1926-2012)
 Bernardo Carvalho (born 1960)
 Bernardo Guimarães (Bernardo Joaquim da Silva Guimarães) (1825–1884)
 Caio Fernando Abreu (1948–1996) novelist, short stories
 Chico Buarque (born 1944)
 Clarice Lispector (1925–1977)
 Cristovam Buarque (born 1944)
 Cristóvão Tezza (born 1952)
 Cyro dos Anjos (1906–1994)
 Érico Veríssimo (1905–1975)
 Esther Largman (born 1934)
 Fernando Sabino (1923-2004)
 Fernando Gabeira (born 1941)
 José Paulo Lanyi (born 1970)
 José Pereira da Graça Aranha (1868–1931)
 Graciliano Ramos (1892–1953)
 João Guimarães Rosa (1908–1967)
 Hilda Hilst (1930–2004)
 Holdemar Menezes (1921–1996)
 João Almino (born 1950)
 João Gilberto Noll (1946-2017)
 João Ubaldo Ribeiro (1941-2014)
 Joaquim Manuel de Macedo (1820–1882)
 Jorge Amado (1912–2001)
 José Américo de Almeida (1887–1980)
 José Cândido Carvalho (1914–1989)
 José de Alencar (1829–1877)
 José Lins do Rego (1901–1957)
 José Mauro de Vasconcelos (1920–1984)
 Lima Barreto (1881–1922)
 Lourenço Mutarelli (born 1964)
 Lúcio Cardoso (1913–1968)
 Luisa Geisler (born 1991)
 Lya Luft (1938-2021)
 Lygia Fagundes Telles (1923-2022)
 Joaquim Maria Machado de Assis (1839–1908)
 Manuel Antônio de Almeida (1831–1861)
 Márcio Souza (born 1946) novelist
 Mário de Andrade (1893–1945)
 Max Mallmann (1968–2016)
 Moacyr Scliar (1937-2011)
 Orígenes Lessa (1903–1986)
 Oswald de Andrade (1890–1954)
 Paola Giometti (born 1983)
 Paulo Coelho (born 1947)
 Paulo Lins (born 1958)
 Rachel de Queiroz (1910–2003)
 Socorro Acioli (born 1975) novelist, journalist 
 Raduan Nassar (born 1935)
 Regina Rheda (born 1957)
 Roberto Drummond (1933–2002)
 Rubem Fonseca (1925-2020)
 Victor Heringer (1988–2018)
 Viscount of Taunay (1843–1899)
 Antônio Gonçalves Teixeira e Souza) (1812–1861)
 Urda Alice Klueger (born 1952)
 Pedro Nava (1903–1984) novelist
 Mário Palmério (1916–1996) novelist
 Nélida Piñon (born 1937) novelist
 Raul Pompéia (1863–1895) novelist
 Godofredo Rangel (1884–1951) novelist
 Marcos Rey (1925–1999) novelist
 José Rezende Filho (1929–1977) novelist
 Júlio Ribeiro (1845–1890) novelist
 Sérgio Sant'Anna (1941-2020) novelist
 José Sarney (born 1930) novelist
 Bernardo Guimarães (1825-1884) (Bernardo Joaquim da Silva Guimarães) - novelist, poet
 Betty Milan (1944- ), psychoanalyst, novelist, essayist, playwright

Literary critics

 Mário de Andrade (1893–1945)
 Oswald de Andrade (1890–1954)
 Alfredo Bosi (1936–2021)
 Antonio Candido (1918-2017)
 Otto Maria Carpeaux (1900–1978)
 Afrânio Coutinho (1911–2000)
 Araripe Júnior (1848–1911)
 Benedito Nunes (1929–2011) critic
 Wilson Martins (1921–2010)
 Tobias Barreto de Meneses (1839–1889)
 José Guilherme Merquior (1941–1991)
 Augusto Meyer (1902–1970)
 Fernandes Pinheiro (1826–1878)
 Sílvio Romero (1851–1914)
 Florêncio Carlos de Abreu e Silva (1839–1881) politician, critic
 José Veríssimo (1857–1916)

Other writers

 Marcelo Cassaro (born 1970) rpg creator, comics writer
 Millôr Fernandes (1924–2012) journalist, poet, essayist
 Zélia Gattai (1916–2008) memoirist, children literature
 Alice Dayrell Caldeira Brant (Helena Morley) (1880-1970) memoirist
 Ricardo Semler (born 1959) business
 Gabriel Soares de Souza (1540-1591) naturalist
 Mateus Soares de Azevedo (born 1959) historian
 Malba Tahan (1895–1974) pen name for Júlio César de Mello e Souza children literature
 Adelmar Tavares (1888-1963) poet
 Franklin Távora (1842–1888) novelist
 Miguel Torres de Andrade (1926-1962) screenplay writer
 Fagundes Varela (1841–1875) poet
 António Vieira (1608–1697) preacher, historian
 Afonso Arinos de Melo Franco (1868–1916) short stories
 Austregésilo de Athayde (1898-1993) journalist
 Fabrício Carpi Nejar (born 1972) poet
 Aristides Fraga Lima (1923–c. 1996) children literature
 Henrique Maximiano Coelho Neto (1864–1934) novelist
 José do Patrocínio (1853-1905) journalist
 Afrânio Peixoto (1876–1947) novelist
 Afonso Schmidt (1890–1964) journalist
 Paulo Setúbal (1893–1937) poet, novelist
 Narbal Fontes (1902–1960) children's literature
 Eduardo Portella (1932-2017) critic
 Francisco de Sales Torres Homem (1822–1891)
 Ivan Ângelo (born 1936) novelist, journalist, short stories
 Paulo Fernando Craveiro (born 1934) romance writer, chronicalist, poet, journalist

References

See also
 List of Brazilian women writers
 List of Latin American writers
 List of Brazilians
 Brazilian literature

Writers
Brazilian
List